The 2018 Heilbronner Neckarcup was a professional tennis tournament played on clay courts. It was the fifth edition of the tournament which was part of the 2018 ATP Challenger Tour. It took place in Heilbronn, Germany between 14 and 20 May 2018.

Singles main-draw entrants

Seeds

 1 Rankings are as of May 7, 2018.

Other entrants
The following players received wildcards into the singles main draw:
  Dominik Köpfer
  Rudolf Molleker
  Marvin Möller
  Tim Pütz

The following players received entry from the qualifying draw:
  Benjamin Hassan
  Daniel Masur
  Igor Sijsling
  Bernabé Zapata Miralles

Champions

Singles

 Rudolf Molleker def.  Jiří Veselý 4–6, 6–4, 7–5.

Doubles

 Rameez Junaid /  David Pel def.  Kevin Krawietz /  Andreas Mies 6–2, 2–6, [10–7].

External links
Official Website

2018 ATP Challenger Tour
2018
May 2018 sports events in Germany
2018 in German tennis